"Level" is a song from the album Broken Boy Soldiers by The Raconteurs. According to the band's official website, it was released as a U.S. radio single. 
Sophie Muller directed the live video for this song. The audio was mixed by Kevin Shirley and assisted by Jared Kvitka at Document Room Studios.

The song charted at number seven on the Billboard Hot Modern Rock Tracks chart. This made it their highest effort on that chart since "Steady, As She Goes" reached number one. The song "Salute Your Solution" would reach number four in 2008.

External links
 Music video (stream)

2006 singles
The Raconteurs songs
Music videos directed by Sophie Muller
Third Man Records singles
Songs written by Brendan Benson
Songs written by Jack White
2006 songs